The 1948 Women's Western Open was a golf competition held at Skycrest Country Club, now known as the Twin Orchard Country Club, in Long Grove, Illinois, which was the 19th edition of the event. Patty Berg won the championship in match play competition by defeating Babe Zaharias in the final match, 37 holes.

Women's Western Open
Golf in Illinois
Women's Western Open
Women's Western Open
Women's Western Open
Women's sports in Illinois